Richard Seifert (born Reubin Seifert; 25 November 1910 – 26 October 2001) was a Swiss-British architect, best known for designing the Centre Point tower and Tower 42 (previously the NatWest Tower), once the tallest building in the City of London. His eponymously named practice – R. Seifert and Partners (later the R. Seifert Company and Partnership) was at its most prolific in the 1960s and 1970s, responsible for many major office buildings in Central London as well as large urban regeneration projects in other major British cities.

Biography
Seifert was born to a Swiss family and came to London when young. He attended the Central Foundation Boys' School and subsequently obtained a scholarship to the Bartlett School of Architecture, graduating in 1933. Seifert served in the Royal Engineers during World War II.

Seifert and his company were responsible for more London buildings than Sir Christopher Wren and designed more than 500 office blocks across the UK and Europe.

National Life Stories conducted an oral history interview (C467/05) with Richard Seifert in 1996 for its Architects Lives' collection held by the British Library.

List of works

London and suburbs 

 90 Long Acre, Westminster
 Barnet House, High Road, Totteridge and Whetstone
 Blackfriars Station, Queen Victoria Street, City of London (1977 design, building was redesigned in 2012)
Beagle House, Tower Hamlets
 Britannia Hotel (The Biltmore, Mayfair Hotel), Grosvenor Square, Mayfair
 Centre Point, New Oxford Street, Camden
 Corinthian House, Lansdowne Road, Croydon
 Drapers Gardens, Throgmorton Avenue, City of London (demolished)
 Essoldo Paddington Cinema, Great Western Road, Westminster (demolished)
 Euston Station, Eversholt Street, Camden
 Goodhart Place, Horseferry Road, Limehouse
 Kensington Forum, Kensington
 Kings Mall, King Street, Hammersmith 1980 
 Kellogg House, Baker Street, Westminster
 Limebank House, Gracechurch Street, City of London (demolished)
 London Penta Hotel (London Forum Hotel), Cromwell Road, Kensington and Chelsea
 London Metropole Hotel, Edgware Road, Westminster
 New Printing House Square, Gray's Inn Road, Camden
 New London Bridge House, 5 London Bridge Street, Southwark (demolished – site now occupied by The News Building)
 No. 1 Croydon (the NLA Tower), Addiscombe Road, Croydon
 One Kemble Street (Space House), off Kingsway, Camden
 1, 2 & 3 St John's Square, Finsbury (now known as Gate House, 1 St John's Square, Clerkenwell, Islington)
 Riverside Baths, Erith, Kent (demolished)
 Sobell Leisure Centre, Islington (1973)
 South Bank Tower, Stamford Street, Southwark
 The Pirate Castle, Oval Road, Camden Town, North London
 Tolworth Tower, Ewell Road, Tolworth, Kingston upon Thames
 Tower 42, Bishopsgate, City of London
 Wembley Conference Centre, Wembley, Middlesex
 Windsor House, London, Victoria Street
 Royal Garden Hotel, Kensington

Outside London 

 Alpha Tower, Birmingham
 Anderston Centre, Glasgow (partly demolished)
 Concourse House, Liverpool (demolished 2009)
 Heron House, Glasgow
 Hilton House, Hilton Street, Manchester
 Gateway House, Piccadilly Approach, Manchester (1969)
 Metropole Hotel, Birmingham
 Sussex Heights, Brighton
 Hexagon Tower, Manchester

References

External links

1910 births
2001 deaths
People educated at Central Foundation Boys' School
Alumni of The Bartlett
20th-century English architects
Architects from London
People from Zürich
British Army personnel of World War II
Royal Engineers officers
English Jews
Swiss Jews
Swiss emigrants to the United Kingdom
Brutalist architects
Modernist architects from England
Skyscraper architects
Naturalised citizens of the United Kingdom